Princess Irene of Greece and Denmark,  (born 11 May 1942) is the youngest child and second daughter of King Paul of Greece and his wife Queen Frederica. She is the younger sister of Queen Sofía of Spain and King Constantine II of Greece.

Biography

Irene was born in Cape Town, South Africa, where her parents were living in exile, on 11 May 1942. She was christened at her parent's Claremont home by the Metropolitan of the Holy Archdiocese of Good Hope. She had ten godparents including General Jan Smuts, Princess Katherine of Greece and Denmark (her paternal aunt), the King of Hellenes (her paternal uncle), Queen Mary of the United Kingdom, and the Duchess of Kent (her paternal first cousin once removed). She was a pupil of concert pianist Gina Bachauer and, for a while, she was a professional concert pianist herself.

Irene was courted by Prince Michel of Orléans, a younger son of the Orléanist pretender Henri, Count of Paris, until he met French noblewoman Béatrice Marie Pasquier de Franclieu, whom he married in 1967.

After her brother was dethroned, Irene moved to India with her mother. Since her mother's death in 1981, she has lived in Spain in an apartment at the Zarzuela Palace in Madrid, the residence of her sister and brother-in-law, Queen Sofía and King Juan Carlos.

Irene is the founder and president of the organisation World in Harmony (Mundo en Armonía). On 16 March 2018, Princess Irene obtained Spanish nationality and renounced her Greek nationality.

Notable published works 
 En Decelia: fragmentos cerámicos de Decelia y miscelánea arqueológica. Athens, (1959–1960). Edited in Spanish in Spain, 2013.

Titles, styles and honours

Titles and styles
11 May 1942 – present: Her Royal Highness Princess Irene of Greece and Denmark.

Honours

 : Dame Grand Cross of the Order of Saints Olga and Sophia.
  House of Bourbon-Two Sicilies: Dame Grand Cross of Justice of the Sacred Military Constantinian Order of Saint George (1962).
   : Knight Grand cross of the Order of Merit of the Italian Republic (27 November 1962).
 : Dame Grand Cross of the Order of Chula Chom Klao (DGC, 14 February 1963).
   : Knight of the Order of the Elephant (R.E. 11 September 1964).

References

Danish princesses
Greek princesses
House of Glücksburg (Greece)
People from Cape Town
1942 births
Living people
Knights Grand Cross of the Order of Merit of the Italian Republic
Dames Grand Cross of the Order of Chula Chom Klao
Naturalised citizens of Spain
Alumni of Schule Schloss Salem
Daughters of kings